Gateley is a village and civil parish in the Breckland district of Norfolk, England.

Location
The parish of Gateley is within the Breckland area of Norfolk. The parish lies south-east of the parish of Great Ryburgh and north-west of the parish of North Elmham. For local Government the Village falls in the Upper Wensum Ward of Breckland District Council and the Elmham and Mattishall Division of Norfolk County Council. The river Wensum runs across the north-east of the parish. Nearby villages include Colkirk and Horningtoft.

History
The village is mentioned in the Domesday Book of 1086. The parish name is old English and translates as 'clearing where goats are kept'. This place name and documentary evidence suggests the settlement has been in existence since at least the Late Saxon period.

Notable buildings

The parish church of Saint Helen
The parish church of Gateley is called St Helen's. The nave dates from the 15th century. The chancel is a Victorian rebuilding. The church tower is of the Perpendicular style. There are two shields on south-west buttress. Tower has rectangular vice, the belfry windows have been partly blocked. On south side of the nave is a round headed arch made up of late medieval tiles although the doorway is of late Saxon origins. The south porch has three niches. The church floor has been renewed but is of brick. The primitive font has a marble plinth . There is a rood screen with fine paintings thought to be East Anglia, which are of a local flavour. The Saints chosen for the screen are for local devotions. 
From left to right they are Saint Etheldreda, foundress of the Diocese of Ely shown as a nun with a Latin inscription, Scta Adria, or Saint Audrey. Next is Saint Elizabeth, also shown dressed in a nun's habit and her arms crossed as if in an echo of the Visitation, The Blessed Virgin, turned to face her cousin. A third image is of the Mistress of Ridibowne, a local devotion. Virtually nothing is known about her. Ridibowne was probably either Redbowne in Lincolnshire or Redbowne in Hertfordshire.
On the other side of the screen are paintings of Saint Louis of France, Henry VI labelled in Latin as 'the Blessed Martyr Henry VI', St Augustine and Sir John Schorne, conjuring the devil into a boot. Sir John Schorne was a clergyman, he is said to be best known for his ability to cure the gout.

Gateley Hall

Gateley Hall is an English Heritage Grade I listed building which was built in 1726, on the site of an older manor house.

The early Georgian house has double shaped gables at each end. On the south gable is an illegible date plaque thought to be 1726, the plaque is paired by a sundial. The front elevation stands over five bays topped with parapets and is of two storeys. Another architectural feature of the house is the Roman Doric doorcase which has the same slightly chequered brickwork as the gables, but has been cemented over. On the rear elevation there is a round brick projecting bay and a flint bay with small blocked windows. Inside the house the half-turn staircase with landings dates from 1726. The stair has Turned attenuated vase at the balusters and shaped tread-ends and a wide swept handrail.  There are examples of Rococo plaster and wood decoration. The grade I listing was put on the building in 1954 partly due to the exceptional quality and rarity of Rococo plasterwork to the interior of the house. There is also a fine barn dating from the 16th Century.

The house is the current seat of the 7th Earl Cathcart, Charles Alan Andrew Cathcart.

Population
At the 2011 Census the population remained less than 100 and was included in the civil parish of North Elmham.

Transport
The nearest 'mainline' railway station is at Wymondham, which is 21 miles south-east (although Norwich is 23 miles and easier to reach by road) of the village and gives access to local services operated by East Midlands Railway and Abellio Greater Anglia on the Breckland Line on the Norwich to Peterborough and Cambridge lines. The nearest station is actually at Dereham, which is on the Mid Norfolk Railway, which runs from Dereham to Wymondham. The nearest airport is Norwich International Airport.

References

Villages in Norfolk
Breckland District
Civil parishes in Norfolk